Pimelea octophylla, commonly known as woolly riceflower or downy riceflower, is a species of flowering plant in the family Thymelaeaceae and is endemic to south-eastern continental Australia. It is an erect shrub with densely hairy young stems, narrowly elliptic leaves and heads of 22 to 45 densely hairy, cream-coloured to pale yellow flowers surrounded by 6 to 12 leaf-like involucral bracts.

Description
The flowers are cream-coloured to pale yellow, either bisexual or female, and densely hairy except at the extreme base. Flowering mainly occurs from August to February.

Taxonomy
Pimelea octophylla was first formally described in 1810 by Robert Brown in his Prodromus Florae Novae Hollandiae.

According to the Australian Plant Census, three former subspecies are now known as synonyms:
 Pimelea octophylla subsp. ciliolaris Threlfall, is a synonym of Pimelea ciliolaris (Threlfall) Rye.
 Pimelea octophylla subsp. petraea Meisn. Threlfall, is a synonym of  Pimelea imbricata var. petrea  (Meisn.) Rye.
 Pimelea octophylla subsp. subvillefera Threlfall, is a synonym of Pimelea subvellifera (Threlfall) Rye.

Distribution and habitat
Woolly riceflower grows in sandy soil, usually over rock and is found between the Eyre Peninsula in South Australia and the Mornington Peninsula in Victoria and is locally common in western Victoria.

References

octophylla
Flora of South Australia
Flora of Victoria (Australia)
Malvales of Australia
Plants described in 1810
Taxa named by Robert Brown (botanist, born 1773)